Saint Mary's Hospital (abbreviated STMH) is a Yale-affiliated urban hospital located at 56 Franklin Street, Waterbury, Connecticut. Operated by Trinity Health, it was founded in 1907 by the Sisters of Saint Joseph of Chambéry and is designated as a Level II trauma center. Saint Mary's has been a teaching hospital for the Yale University School of Medicine for over 40 years.

History
In 2011, Waterbury Hospital and St. Mary's Hospital said they planned on merging. The merger between St. Mary's Hospital and Waterbury Hospital was called off in 2012.

In July 2014 Tenet Healthcare announced that the hospital would be acquired by a Tenet subsidiary, with the hospital's religious directives and uncompensated care policies remaining intact. Tenet was chosen by the hospital after a four-year selection process. The Tenet deal unraveled in 2015 when Tenet expressed concern with the conditions on the sale set by the state of Connecticut.

In September 2015, Saint Mary's Hospital was acquired by Livonia, Michigan-based Trinity Health, who had recently acquired Saint Francis Hospital & Medical Center in Hartford. In 2018, Trinity Health opened a center for multiple sclerosis treatment and research at the hospital.

Hospital rating data
The HealthGrades website contains quality data for St. Mary's Hospital as of 2016. For this rating section three different types of data from HealthGrades, 9 or 10 are the two highest possible ratings. Percentage of patients rating this hospital as a 9 or 10 - 67%.

References

External links
 St. Mary's Hospital (Waterbury) website

Tenet Healthcare
Hospital buildings completed in 1907
Hospitals in Connecticut
Hospitals established in 1907
Buildings and structures in Waterbury, Connecticut
1907 establishments in Connecticut